Flavia Titiana was a Roman empress, wife of emperor Pertinax, who ruled briefly in 193 (known as "Year of the Five Emperors").

Life
Flavia Titiana was the daughter of a Senator, Titus Flavius Claudius Sulpicianus, and sister of Titus Flavius Titianus (b. ca 165), consul suffectus ca 200. Her maternal grandfather was Titus Flavius Titianus, who was praefectus of Aegyptus from 126 to 133. Titiana married Publius Helvius Pertinax, a rich self-made man who had a successful military and civil career. She bore two children, a boy called Publius Helvius Pertinax and a daughter.

Pertinax was proclaimed emperor after the murder of Commodus on January 1, 193. While the new princeps was offering the customary sacrifice on the Capitoline Hill, the Roman Senate gave Flavia Titiana the honorary title of Augusta. After the murder of Pertinax by the Praetorian Guard on March 28, neither Flavia nor her children were hurt.

The highly unreliable Historia Augusta claims that Flavia Titiana "carried on an amour quite openly with a man who sang to the lyre", but Pertinax was not concerned.

See also
 List of Roman and Byzantine empresses

References

External links

Flavii
2nd-century Roman empresses